Janaki Devi Bajaj Institute of Management Studies (JDBIMS) is a business school exclusively for women. It is affiliated to SNDT Women's University, Mumbai. It started at the SNDT campus in New Marine Lines at Mumbai. Presently the institute runs from a Juhu campus. It offers Master in Management Studies (MMS) in business management, equivalent to an MBA degree. The institute offers other short-term courses related to business and management.

JDBIMS tries to provide quality training to women and encourage them to come to the foreground of global business inception.

Courses offered
Janaki Devi Bajaj Institute of Management Studies offers a postgraduate M.A. in Management Studies.

References

External links 
 

Business schools in Mumbai
Women's universities and colleges in Maharashtra